The All-Ireland Men's Senior Football Championship, the premier competition in Gaelic football, is an annual series of games played in Ireland during the summer and early autumn, and organised by the Gaelic Athletic Association (GAA). Contested by the top male inter-county football teams in Ireland, the tournament has taken place every year since 1887, except in 1888 when the competition was not played due to a tour of the United States by would-be competitors.

The competition culminates on the third or fourth Sunday in September with the All-Ireland Men's Senior Football Championship Final. The winning team receives the Sam Maguire Cup. The final has been played at Croke Park in Dublin since 1913, with the exception of the 1947 final which was played at the Polo Grounds in New York. Finals held before the GAA's acquirement of Croke Park were played at venues around Dublin and the counties of Cork, Kildare and Tipperary.

History

Teams from the southern province of Munster shared the early titles, with Limerick, Tipperary and Cork winning the first three finals. The first Championship featured club teams who represented their respective counties after their county championship. The 21 a-side final, played in Beech Hill, Donnybrook on 29 April 1888, was contested between Commercials of Limerick and Young Irelands of Louth, with Commercials winning by 1–4 to 0–3.

The second Championship was unfinished owing to the American Invasion Tour. The 1888 provincial championships had been completed (won by Tipperary, Kilkenny and Monaghan, with no Connacht teams entering) but after the Invasion Tour ended, the All-Ireland semi-final and final were not played. London reached the final four times in the early years of the competition (1900–03).

The 1903 Championship brought Kerry's first All-Ireland title. They went on to become the most successful football team in the history of the All-Ireland Senior Football Championship. As of 2022, the Kingdom have won the competition on 38 occasions, including two four-in-a-rows (1929–32 and 1978–81) and two three-in-a-rows (1939–41 and 1984–86). Galway were the first team from the western province of Connacht to win an All-Ireland title, in 1925, while Cavan were the first from the northern province of Ulster, in 1933.

The first half of the twentieth century brought the rise of several teams who won two or more All-Ireland titles during this period, such as Kildare, Mayo, Cavan, Wexford and Roscommon. Wexford won four consecutive titles between 1915 and 1918, while Kildare were the first winners of the Sam Maguire Cup in 1928. Cavan won five titles between 1933 and 1952, including in 1947 when the final was played in New York. None of these teams have won an All-Ireland title since, with only Kildare, Mayo and Roscommon reaching the final. Most notably, Mayo have appeared in eleven finals since winning their last title in 1951, losing them all (1989, 1996 after a replay, 1997, 2004, 2006, 2012, 2013, 2016 after a replay, 2017, 2020 and 2021); this is the longest unbroken sequence of losing finals in the history of the competition.

A record 90,556 attended the 1961 final between Down and Offaly. In the 1990s, a significant sea change took place, as the All-Ireland was claimed by an Ulster team in four consecutive years (1991–94). Since then Ulster has produced more All-Ireland winning teams than any other province. The introduction of the qualifier system (commonly known as the "back door") in 2001 enabled Galway to reach and win that year's final despite losing to Roscommon in the Connacht semi-finals; a further five teams have since claimed the All-Ireland after coming through the qualifiers (Tyrone in 2005 and 2008, Kerry in 2006 and 2009, and Cork in 2010). The 2003 final between Tyrone and Armagh was the first to be contested by two teams from the same province.

The duration of certain championship matches increased from 60 to 80 minutes during the 1970s. They were settled at 70 minutes after five seasons of this in 1975. This applied only to the provincial finals, All-Ireland semi-finals and finals.

Finals
The following table sets out the winning team and beaten finalist of each All-Ireland Senior Football Championship final. The vast majority of finals were contested by the winning semi-finalists, although in certain cases in the early years a provincial championship had not been completed in time and the affected province nominated a team to participate in the All-Ireland semi-final. In some of these cases, the nominated team (e.g. Dublin in 1905) won its semi-final, but was then vanquished in their provincial championship, and their place in the All-Ireland final taken by another team from that province.

Key

All teams are based in Ireland, except for London and New York.

Results

 Originally, a goal outweighed any number of points. In 1892, the value of a goal was set at five points; this was reduced to three in 1896.  
 The 1894 replay was abandoned after Dublin walked off when some of their players were assaulted by Cork supporters. Cork led by two points at the time, but Dublin were awarded the championship as Cork were deemed to have been responsible for the abandonment.
 The 1910 final was scratched and Louth were awarded the championship after Kerry refused to travel to Dublin as the Great Southern and Western Railway would not sell tickets to their fans at reduced rates.
 Kerry beat Cavan 1–7 to 2–3 in the semi-final, but after an objection by Cavan and counter-objection by Kerry, both sides were disqualified. Galway were declared champions but, following protests, a substitute competition between the four provincial finalists was organised, with Galway and Cavan proceeding to the final.
 Game played behind closed doors due to the COVID-19 pandemic in the Republic of Ireland
 Game played at 50% capacity due to the COVID-19 pandemic in the Republic of Ireland

Results by team

See also
 List of All-Ireland Senior Hurling Championship finals
 List of National Football League (Ireland) finals

References

 
Finals